The harlequin tuskfish, Choerodon fasciatus, is a species of wrasse native to the western Pacific Ocean.  It occasionally makes its way into the aquarium trade.

Description

It is a brightly colored marine fish with shades of blue, green, and orange. It has sharp blue teeth. The specimens found in Australia generally have brighter coloration.

Diet
The harlequin tuskfish is a carnivore, eating mostly benthic invertebrates such as echinoderms, crustaceans, molluscs, and worms.

Distribution and habitat
This species is found in the western Pacific Ocean in two separate areas. One is from the Ryukyus to Taiwan and the other is from Queensland, Australia, to New Caledonia.

In the Aquarium

The Harlequin Tusk is a moderately difficult fish to maintain in captivity. Juveniles can be shy and easily bullied by aggressive tankmates, while adults will be quite aggressive. At a minimum, they should be kept in a 120-gallon tank for a single specimen. They will accept frozen and meaty foods such as brine shrimp, mysis, and shellfish. It is a semi-aggressive fish and ideal tankmates would include angels, tangs, and small triggerfish. However, it will not tolerate its own kind, so there should be only one specimen per tank. They are not reef-safe. Although they will typically not nip at corals or sessile invertebrates, they will attack and consume crabs, hermit crabs, snails, and shrimp.

References

Harlequin tuskfish
Fish described in 1867
Taxa named by Albert Günther